Vocational School No 48 is a vocational school in Isfana, Kyrgyzstan. It was previously known as Professional Technical School No 48. The school is home to a reserve company of Leilek District Administration.

Vocational School No 48 offers a diverse set of vocational classes including sewing, cooking, carpentry, electrician, and driving classes. Construction of a new building of the school commenced in 2008. It is scheduled to be put into operation in 2018.

References

External links 
 Vocational School No. 48 on the website of Education Development Center in Kyrgyzstan 

Vocational schools in Kyrgyzstan
Schools in Isfana